Breakout is a Canadian television series that aired on the National Geographic Channel throughout the world. It dramatizes real life prison breakouts. The series premiered on March 28, 2010, and aired its last episode on March 23, 2013. It was listed as a Canada/UK co-production.

A number of different producers, writers, actors and other film professionals worked on different episodes.

Episode 15, which featured the prison escape of South African political prisoners Tim Jenkin, Stephen Lee and Alex Moumbaris from Pretoria Central Prison in 1979, was shown in the UK on 19 April 2013. This escape was again dramatized in the feature-length film, Escape from Pretoria, starring Daniel Radcliffe.

Episodes

Season 1 (2010)

Season 2 (2013)

References

External links
 
 

National Geographic (American TV channel) original programming
2010 Canadian television series debuts
2010s Canadian documentary television series
English-language television shows
Prison escapes
Canadian television docudramas
Discovery Channel (Canada) original programming
2013 Canadian television series endings